Kevi Llanaj (born 9 April 1999) is an Albanian professional footballer who play as a winger for Albanian club Partizani.

References

1999 births
Living people
Footballers from Tirana
Albanian footballers
Association football forwards
Kategoria e Dytë players
Kategoria e Parë players
Kategoria Superiore players
KF Tirana players
FK Vora players
FK Partizani Tirana players